Flamingo is the second studio album by the rock band the Flamin' Groovies. It was released in 1970. Following the group's departure from the Epic record label, it was the first of their two albums for Kama Sutra Records.

Flamingo was produced by Richard Robinson at Pacific High Studios in San Francisco. It was recorded on an unusual 12-track machine built by Scully Recording Instruments. It used the same one inch tape as professional 8-track studio recorders but with a slightly narrower track width. Guitarist Cyril Jordan later blamed the  "squelched" sound of the album on the 12-track recorder. The 12-track system was used by other artists, such as Tom Scholz of Boston, who raved about the sound quality. However, 12-track was soon overtaken by the two inch 16-track format and the Flamin' Groovies used this for their next album.

Critical reception
The A.V. Club wrote that Flamingo "is passionate, stripped-down revival music as it should be: It's riveting through and through, and brimming with a conviction contrary to the indulgences that marked San Francisco's music scene at the time."

Track listing
All songs written by Cyril Jordan and Roy Loney except where noted.

Side 1
 "Gonna Rock Tonight" (Loney)
 "Comin' After Me"
 "Headin' for the Texas Border"
 "Sweet Roll Me on Down"
 "Keep a Knockin'" (Richard Penniman)

Side 2
 "Second Cousin" (Loney)
 "Childhood's End" (Loney)
 "Jailbait"
 "She's Falling Apart" (Loney)
 "Road House"

1995 Big Beat CD bonus tracks
 "Walking the Dog" (Rufus Thomas)
 "Somethin' Else" (Eddie Cochran, Sharon Sheeley)
 "My Girl Josephine" (Dave Bartholemew, Fats Domino)
 "Louie Louie" (Richard Berry)
 "Rockin' Pneumonia and the Boogie Woogie Flu" (Huey "Piano" Smith, John Vincent)
 "Going Out Theme"

1999 Buddha CD bonus tracks
 "My Girl Josephine"
 "Around and Around"
 "Rockin' Pneumonia and the Boogie Woogie Flu"
 "Somethin' Else"
 "Rumble"
 "Going Out Theme"

Personnel
Flamin' Groovies
Roy Loney - vocals, guitar
Cyril Jordan - guitar, vocals
Tim Lynch - guitar, vocals
George Alexander - bass guitar
Danny Mihm - drums, percussion
Commander Cody - piano

References

Flamin' Groovies albums
1970 albums
Kama Sutra Records albums